Baimaclia is a commune in Căușeni District, Moldova. It is composed of two villages, Baimaclia and Surchiceni.

References

Communes of Căușeni District